Bornholm is an island in the Baltic Sea. "Bornholm" may also refer to:

Places
 Bornholm, Ontario, a small community in Canada
 Bornholm, Western Australia, a small town in Australia
 Bornholm County, a former county in Denmark
 Bornholmer Straße border crossing, one of the former border crossings between East Berlin and West Berlin between 1961 and 1990

Others
 4453 Bornholm, an asteroid
 Bornholm disease, a viral disease
 Bornholm, a type of longcase clock
Battle of Bornholm (disambiguation), various clashes from 1227 to 1945
Bornholm (band), Hungarian melodic black metal band